Peter Byrne (born 1950) is an emeritus professor in Philosophy at King's College London . Born in Wallasey on 18 July 1950 and raised in Norris Green, Liverpool. He was educated at West Derby School, an all boys' Comprehensive. He studied Philosophy at the University of York, graduating with a first class degree in 1971, followed by a BPhil in Philosophy at Linacre College, Oxford. He was a lecturer, then later professor, of Philosophy and Ethics at Kings College from 1976 to 2009. In addition he was head of the department of Theology and Religious Studies at Kings from 2000 to 2002 and president of The British Society for the Philosophy of Religion from 2003 to 2005. He was also for several years editor of the journal Religious Studies.

He is the author of several books, including:
 Natural Religion and the Nature of Religion - the Legacy of Deism, 1989, Routledge, London
 The Philosophical and Theological Foundations of Ethics, 1992, Macmillan, Basingstoke and London. [1999 second, expanded edition]
 Religion Defined and Explained, 1993, Macmillan, Basingstoke and London,  - with Peter B. Clarke
 Prolegomena to Religious Pluralism: Reference and Realism in Religion 1995, Macmillan, Basingstoke and London
 The Moral Interpretation of Religion, 1998, Edinburgh University Press, Edinburgh / Eerdmans, Grand Rapids, Michigan
 Philosophical and Ethical Problems in Mental Handicap, 2000, Macmillan, Basingstoke and London
 God and Realism, 2003, Ashgate Publishing, Aldershot
 Kant on God, 2007, Ashgate Publishing, Aldershot

References 

1950 births
Academics of King's College London
Alumni of Linacre College, Oxford
Alumni of the University of York
Ethicists
Lecturers
Living people
Nationality missing
Philosophers of religion
Philosophy writers
Place of birth missing (living people)